Dawley is a constituent town and civil parish in Telford and Wrekin in Shropshire, England. It was originally, in 1963, going to be the main centre of the 'Dawley New Town' plan before it was decided in 1968 to name the new town as 'Telford', after the engineer and road-builder Thomas Telford. Dawley now forms part of Telford whose town centre is north of Dawley itself.

Dawley is one of the older settlements in Shropshire, being mentioned in the Domesday Book (1086). It is divided into Dawley Magna ("Great Dawley") and Little Dawley (also shown as Dawley Parva ("Little Dawley") on older maps).

Etymology
The name Dawley comes from Old English meaning woodland clearing associated with a man called Dealla.

Local government
The town's main civil parish is officially called Great Dawley – its parish council is officially Great Dawley Town Council. Dawley Hamlets is a separate civil parish, which covers Little Dawley and other neighbouring villages/suburbs.

Railways
The nearest railway station is Telford Central. Historically, the Great Western Railway maintained a line that passed through the parish, going through the tunnel at Heath Hill. This tunnel is still used and is currently part of Telford Steam Railway's expansion project. It was also served by the single platformed station at Dawley and Stirchley railway station on the Coalport Branch Line which ran from Hadley to Coalport. It opened in 1860 but closed in 1952 and the trackbed including platform now form part of the Silkin Way.

History
Dawley is mentioned in the Domesday Book and is therefore one of the older settlements in Shropshire.

There was a castle in Dawley, but it was demolished around 1648. The site is unknown, although the Castle Pools (on the old quarry site) and Castle Ironworks (built by the Darby family, one of whom commissioned the world-famous Iron Bridge) possibly indicate the general area where it may have stood. Prior to the landscaping that followed the creation of Telford New Town, extensive ruins were detectable next to the Castle Pools and are shown on old maps as being the location of the castle, but, in the 1980s, the whole area was buried under thick topsoil and planted with trees. Ironbridge is a short distance away.

For over three centuries, Dawley was a mining town, both for coal and ironstone. Clay extraction, for local industrial-pipe factories, brickyards and the pottery industry, have been major influences on the landscape. Mining had an important impact on the local culture. In 1821, production at Dawley's ironworks of was halted by striking miners in protest at lowering of their wages. Many of the workers in Dawley joined a larger group of protesters in what came to be known as the Cinderloo Uprising. In 1872, the Springwell Pit Disaster resulted in the deaths of eight men and boys.

Prior to large-scale levelling as part of the development of Telford New Town, the area was covered by clay mounds and large clay pits that dominated the landscape, to the extent that they formed points of reference for the locals. There is still a local clay-pipe factory in the adjacent Doseley village; grey clay predominates on the immediate outskirts of Dawley.

The adjacent village of Horsehay was the site of a bridge and later a crane fabrication factory that exported around the world. The Victoria Falls Bridge is wrongly claimed to have been built there. Telford Steam Railway trust is located across the road from the former factory site.

On 7 June 2010, Dawley had become subject to a lot of media attention because some locals had recreated the 'Hollywood' sign on a noticeable bank on Paddock Mount but with Dawley instead of Hollywood. The Shropshire Star had a full-page spread article on that day's evening edition to honour the effort made by the locals. As of midday on 8 June, over 1000 people had joined a Facebook group showing support for the sign, acknowledging the efforts of its creators, and in protest against the controversial redevelopment of the mount to move the Phoenix Academy (now the Telford Langley School) there.

Dawley is known for its dialect, which includes some quite unique words, including "bist", presumably from the German meaning "are". However, the dialect is largely lost. Along with the dialect were various conventions and traditions, notably the "pig on the wall". Traditionally, Dawley residents would show their support for The Dawley Prize Band or other civic marches by placing their pigs on their walls. The pig also features in the dialect, with a romantic phrase apparently being "I wudna swop thee for a big black pig!"

Geography

Dawley has a street-market every Friday. Dawley town centre consists of a single pedestrianised street that was previously the main route from Bridgnorth in the south to Wellington in the north. The area around Dawley, not covered by Telford New Town, is rural and provides extensive opportunities for walking. The Ironbridge Gorge and The Wrekin are both pleasant walks from Dawley.

On the northern edge of Dawley is Malinslee where St. Leonards church stands.
The design of St. Leonards, a slightly irregular octagon, is said to have been influenced by Thomas Telford.
Other churches supposedly influenced by Thomas Telford during his work in Shropshire are at nearby Madeley and Bridgnorth.

Education
There are seven primary schools in the Dawley area, and a comprehensive secondary school, Telford Langley School. There are two special schools in Dawley: Queensway South campus (formerly Mount Gilbert School) and Southall School.

In July 2012, the Department for Education and Arts Council England selected Telford & Wrekin as one of the new areas for the In Harmony programme, working with Old Park Primary School and Children's Centre, Telford & Wrekin Music, City of Birmingham Symphony Orchestra and the Manchester Camerata. In Harmony is a national programme that aims to inspire and transform the lives of children in deprived communities, using the power and disciplines of community-based orchestral music-making.

Notable people
Samuel Peploe (1667-1752), later Bishop of Chester, was a native of Dawley Parva, where he was baptised.

Thomas Botfield (1762-1843), metallurgist, geologist and inventor, was born at Dawley.

William 'Billy' Ball (1795–1852), the 'Shropshire Giant', was a nineteenth-century iron puddler and giant.

John Poole Sandlands (1838-1915), clergyman, naturopath and vegetarian activist, was born in Dawley.

Dawley was the birthplace in 1848 of Captain Matthew Webb who was the first man to swim the English Channel – his monument stands on the High Street. Legend suggests that a pig stood up against a wall to watch the parade in Webb's honour that was held on his return. Two roads in the town, Captain Webb Drive and Webb Crescent, are named after him, as is the Captain Webb Primary School.

Albert Stanley (1863-1915), Liberal, later Labour politician, was born in Dark Lane, Dawley.

William Foulke, a former England international goalkeeper, was born at Dawley in 1874. Joe Butler, another professional football goalkeeper who made 457 appearances for several clubs in The Football League, was born at Dawley Bank in 1879.

Joseph Simpson (1909-1968) was born in Dawley, and was the head of the London Metropolitan Police, from 1958 to 1968.

Edith Pargeter (1913-1995), who in later life under her pen name of Ellis Peters wrote the Brother Cadfael novels, went to school in Dawley. She grew up with her family in King Street, Dawley and published her first novel in 1936 while working at a chemist's shop in the town. Numerous roads in Aqueduct, such as Cadfael Drive and Ellis Peters Drive, are 'themed' after her.

Roy Pritchard (1925-1993), professional footballer, played in Football League for Wolverhampton Wanderers, Aston Villa, Notts County and Port Vale, appearing in 1949 FA Cup Final, was born at Dawley.

Thomas (aka Tommy) Nicholls (1931-2021), boxer, lived at Brandlee, Dawley at time of his Olympic appearances in 1952 and 1956.

Eddie Garbett (born 1949), footballer for Shrewsbury Town, Barrow and Stockport County, was born at Dawley.

Danielle Jones, a fictional character in EastEnders during 2008–09 (played by Lauren Crace) came from Dawley.

Former Aston Villa striker Dalian Atkinson was living in Little Dawley at the time of his death in 2016.

See also
 Listed buildings in Great Dawley
 Listed buildings in Dawley Hamlets
 Shropshire Revolution – American football Team, based in Dawley

References

External links

Great Dawley Town Council
Dawley Hamlets Parish Council

Telford
Market towns in Shropshire
Towns in Shropshire